Bonhomme is a surname. The word comes from the French language and literally means "good man", also meaning "fellow", "old man" or "chap." 

Notable people with the surname include:

 Jacques Bonhomme, real name Guillaume Cale (died 1358), leader of the Jacquerie peasant revolt in 1358
 Mandy Bonhomme, stage name of voice actress Amanda Goodman
 Paul Bonhomme (born 1964), English aerobatics and commercial airliner pilot and race pilot
 Tessa Bonhomme (born 1985), Canadian ice hockey player and sports reporter
 Yolande Bonhomme (c. 1490–1557), French printer and bookseller

French-language surnames